Artyom Rostislavovich Sapozhkov (born 21 March 1990) is a Russian former professional football player.

Club career
He made his Russian Football National League debut for FC Sokol Saratov on 6 July 2014 in a game against FC Yenisey Krasnoyarsk. That was his only season in the FNL.

External links
 
 

1990 births
People from Novokuznetsk
Living people
Russian footballers
Association football midfielders
FC Saturn Ramenskoye players
FC Oryol players
FC Sokol Saratov players
FC Khimik-Arsenal players
FC Novokuznetsk players
FC Torpedo Vladimir players
Sportspeople from Kemerovo Oblast